Clydebank and Milngavie may refer to::

 Clydebank and Milngavie (UK Parliament constituency)
 Clydebank and Milngavie (Scottish Parliament constituency)